The 1928–29 season was Real Madrid Club de Fútbol's 27th season in existence, and their first in the Primera División, the top flight of Spanish football. The club also played in the Campeonato Regional Centro (Central Regional Championship) and the Copa del Rey.

First-team squad

Transfers

In

Friendlies

Competitions

Overview

La Liga

League table

Matches

Campeonato Regional Centro

League table

Matches

Copa del Rey

Notes

External links
Real Madrid History 

1928-1929
Spanish football clubs 1928–29 season